Nadine Zumkehr (born 5 February 1985) is a Swiss beach volleyball player.
As of 2012, she played with Simone Kuhn. The pair participated in the 2012 Summer Olympics tournament and were eliminated in the round of 16 by the American pair of Jennifer Kessy and April Ross who went on to win silver.

Professional career

As of 2013 she now plays with Joana Heidrich. The pair participated in the 2016 summer Olympics in Rio with a 14th seed, as of 12 June 2016, placement. They lost against Brazil's #1 seed team of Talita Antunes and Larissa Franca in a nail biting match of 3 sets (21-23, 27–25, 15–13), which was also the longest match at Rio, in the quarter final Played 14 August 2016.

Zumkehr played her last Beach Volleyball game at the Toronto World Finals and will retire.

World tour 2016
She is competing at the World Tour finals in Toronto.
The pair played against fellow country mates of Isabelle Forrer and Anouk Verge-Depre and won in 3 sets of (14-21, 21–15, 15–10).
The pair advanced to Gold medal match against Germany's Olympic Gold medalists of Laura Ludwig and Kira Walkenhorst. They lost to the German's in straight sets of (18-21, 16–21) and finish with silver medal.

References

External links

 
 
 

1985 births
Swiss beach volleyball players
Living people
Beach volleyball players at the 2012 Summer Olympics
Beach volleyball players at the 2016 Summer Olympics
Olympic beach volleyball players of Switzerland